Mount Worthington is a  elevation double-summit mountain located in the eastern Olympic Mountains in Jefferson County of Washington state. It is set within Buckhorn Wilderness, on land managed by the Olympic National Forest. The nearest neighbor is Iron Mountain,  to the southwest, and the nearest higher peak is Buckhorn Mountain,  to the southwest. Precipitation runoff from Mount Worthington drains south into the Big Quilcene River, or north into Copper Creek which is a tributary of the Dungeness River. This mountain was first known as Copper Peak, but was renamed by Jack Christensen for the William J. Worthington family, pioneers of nearby Quilcene. Copper was mined in the Tubal Cain mine at the northern base of this mountain in the early 1900s. In the same vicinity of the abandoned mine are the remains of a modified  B-17 plane that crashed on January 19, 1952, when returning from a search-and-rescue mission.

Climate

Mount Worthington is located in the marine west coast climate zone of western North America. Most weather fronts originate in the Pacific Ocean, and travel northeast toward the Olympic Mountains. As fronts approach, they are forced upward by the peaks of the Olympic Range, causing them to drop their moisture in the form of rain or snowfall (Orographic lift). As a result, the Olympics experience high precipitation, especially during the winter months in the form of snowfall. During winter months, weather is usually cloudy, but, due to high pressure systems over the Pacific Ocean that intensify during summer months, there is often little or no cloud cover during the summer. Because of maritime influence, snow tends to be wet and heavy, resulting in avalanche danger.

Geology

The Olympic Mountains are composed of obducted clastic wedge material and oceanic crust, primarily Eocene sandstone, turbidite, and basaltic oceanic crust. The mountains were sculpted during the Pleistocene era by erosion and glaciers advancing and retreating multiple times.

Gallery

See also

 Geology of the Pacific Northwest
 Geography of Washington (state)

References

External links
 Mt. Worthington weather: National Weather Service
 William J. Worthington biography

Worthington
Worthington
Worthington
Worthington